Robert Dawson (born 1 August 1963) is a Scottish former association footballer, who played for Stirling Albion, St Mirren and Clyde. Dawson was part of the St Mirren team that won against Scottish champions Rangers in August 1989.

References

External links

1963 births
Living people
Footballers from Stirling
Association football fullbacks
Scottish footballers
Stirling Albion F.C. players
St Mirren F.C. players
Clyde F.C. players
Scottish Football League players